Stephen Butler (born 1954) is an Australian former rugby league footballer who played in Sydney's NSWRFL competition in the 1970s. He was a two-time premiership winner in his three year career in the top grade.

Career
Butler came through the junior ranks at the St George Dragons - the S.G. Ball Cup and Jersey Flegg Cup. He was graded in 1976 and played most of the year in the Under23s.

He won a premiership with St George Dragons in his debut first grade year in 1977 after replacing Tony Graham in the starting line up. He played wing in the 1977 drawn Grand Final and the 1977 Grand Final replay and had a marvellous year under the coaching of Harry Bath. 

He played 1978, and was a reserve back in the 1979 Grand Final taking the field late in the match to replace the injured Michael Sorridimi. He retired after the match.

References

 

St. George Dragons players
Living people
Australian rugby league players
1954 births
Rugby league wingers
Date of birth missing (living people)
Place of birth missing (living people)